Roden (roðer, "rowing") is the old designation of the coastal areas of Svealand (the yellow areas in the map), that in wartime would man and equip the ships that sailed out in ledung.

It was not only the eastern part of the province of Uppland that was called "Roden" (called Sæland by Snorri Sturluson) but also other provinces by the Swedish "East sea" (Baltic Sea), like the coastal areas of the province Östergötland. It was called roþi by Northmen in the 11 th century that wrote down the words on the Uppland Runic Inscription 11. 

The scholarly consensus is that the Rus' people originated in what is currently coastal eastern Sweden around the eighth century and that their name has the same origin as Roslagen in Sweden (with the older name being Roden). According to the prevalent theory, the name Rus, like the Proto-Finnic name for Sweden (*Ruotsi), is derived from an Old Norse term for "the men who row" (rods-) as rowing was the main method of navigating the rivers of Eastern Europe, and that it could be linked to the Swedish coastal area of Roslagen (Rus-law) or Roden, as it was known in earlier times. The name Rus would then have the same origin as the Finnish and Estonian names for Sweden: Ruotsi  and Rootsi.

References 

Uppland
Geographic history of Sweden